The Local Government Category List (LGCL), is a metadata standard controlled vocabulary of subject metadata terms related to local government, published in the UK. It has been superseded by the Integrated Public Sector Vocabulary (IPSV) but remains available for reference.

Development
The LGCL was developed by the Local Authority Websites National Project (LAWs), an initiative that aimed to meet the "requirement for a structured approach to information handling, publication and navigation". The LGCL was created as part of the Information Architecture & Standards project strand, the responsibility for which was delegated to the London Borough of Camden. Version 1.0 was released in October 2003 and version 1.01 in the following month. Version 1.02 was released in January 2004 and officially remains the current full version. Version 1.03 was published in March 2004 but is still considered to be a draft.
The LGCL was merged with the Government Category List, and the seamlessUK taxonomy to form the Integrated Public Sector Vocabulary (IPSV) as part of the UK Government e-GMS initiative. The LGCL has since been mapped back to the IPSV as well as having been mapped to the Government Category List and the Local Government Services List (the 'PID List') and the previous APLAWS Category List. The LGCL and mappings are published in XML, PDF and Word formats. LGCL is formally deprecated in favour of the IPSV.

Description
The LGCL comprises a poly-hierarchy of terms, comprising thirteen broad high-level terms divided into increasingly detailed sub-levels. The top-level terms are:
Business
Community and living
Council, government and democracy
Education and learning
Environment
Health and social care
Housing
Jobs and careers
Legal services
Leisure and culture
Policing and public safety
Social issues
Transport and streets

These top-level terms are each divided into two-level terms, some of which may be further sub-divided into as many as four further sub-levels of detail. Thus, for example, "Wheelchairs" appears as a sixth-level sub-division of Health and social care:
Health and social care
Health and medical care
Physical disability
Disability equipment 
Mobility
Wheelchairs

Terms may be repeated at different levels but have consistent meanings, so, for example, "Cycling" appears as a type of transport route under "Transport and streets","Cycling, pedestrian and other pathways","Cycling" as well as an outdoor pursuit under "Leisure and culture","Sports","Types of sports", "Outdoor pursuits", "Cycling". Synonyms are provided for many of the preferred terms. The standard also includes a commitment that terms will never be removed from the list but may change status or move position in the hierarchy between versions.

Use
One of the intended uses of the standard was to provide a default local authority Web site navigation hierarchy that could be used flexibly with an appropriate level of detail to meet local requirements. The standard was also recommended for use as the basis of records management system file plans.

Availability
The LGCL remains freely available "without guarantees and without licensing costs" and may be used and reproduced free of charge provided specific restrictions and appropriate attribution are respected.

References

External links
 Where can I find the latest Local Government Category List (LGCL)?

Communications in the United Kingdom
E-government in the United Kingdom
Information systems
Local government in the United Kingdom
Metadata standards